= Ruyi Masood Textile Park =

Industrial textile park in Faisalabad, Pakistan

Ruyi Masood Textile Park is an integrated industrial-textile park located in M-3 Industrial Estate in Faisalabad, Punjab province of Pakistan.
